James Maher Rosenberger (April 6, 1887 – January 1, 1946) was an American track and field athlete and a member of the Irish American Athletic Club. He was born in New York City and died in Brooklyn, New York.

In 1909, at the Amateur Athletic Union (AAU) metropolitan senior championships, held at Travers Island, Rosenberger took first place in 100 and 220 yard dash. The following week, Rosenberger was part of the Irish American Athletic Club's four-man relay team that broke the world's record for the one mile relay, with a time of 3 minutes 20 2/5 seconds. The other three men on the record breaking team were; C.S. Cassara, Melvin Sheppard, and William Robbins.

On April 9, 1911, Rosenberger anchored the Irish American Athletic Club 4×440 yard relay team that broke the world record at Celtic Park, Queens, New York, and set the first IAAF- recognized world record for 4×440 yard or 4×400 meter relay race, in time of 3 minutes and 18.2 seconds. The other members of the world record setting team were Harry Gissing, Mel Sheppard and Harry Schaaf.

Rosenberger participated in the 1912 Summer Olympics, but was eliminated in a 400 m semifinal. Next year he competed in Australia with the AAU team, and in 1915 he became the coach for the Long Island Athletic Club.

References

Further reading

External links
Archives of Irish America – NYU
Winged Fist Organization

1887 births
1946 deaths
American male sprinters
Olympic track and field athletes of the United States
Athletes (track and field) at the 1912 Summer Olympics
World record setters in athletics (track and field)
Track and field athletes from New York City
USA Outdoor Track and Field Championships winners